opened in Tendō, Yamagata Prefecture, Japan in 1988. The museum building dates to the Meiji period.

See also

 List of Cultural Properties of Japan - paintings (Yamagata)
 Homma Museum of Art
 Yamagata Museum of Art
 Hakutsuru Fine Art Museum

References

External links
  Dewazakura Museum of Art

Tendō, Yamagata
Museums in Yamagata Prefecture
Art museums and galleries in Japan
Museums established in 1988
1988 establishments in Japan